Eagle Butte is a city in Dewey and Ziebach counties in South Dakota, United States. The population was 1,258 at the 2020 census.

Description
Eagle Butte is the tribal headquarters of the Cheyenne River Sioux Tribe on the Cheyenne River Indian Reservation.

The city takes its name from Eagle Butte.

Geography
Eagle Butte is located at  (44.996502, -101.235875).

Eagle Butte has been assigned the ZIP code 57625 and the FIPS place code 17620.

Demographics

2010 census
As of the census of 2010, there were 1,318 people, 384 households, and 279 families living in the city. The racial makeup of the city was 6.8% White, 0.3% African American, 89.2% Native American, 0.2% Asian, 0.2% from other races, and 3.3% from two or more races. Hispanic or Latino of any race were 4.3% of the population.

There were 384 households, of which 59.6% had children under the age of 18 living with them, 19.3% were married couples living together, 44.5% had a female householder with no husband present, 8.9% had a male householder with no wife present, and 27.3% were non-families. 24.2% of all households were made up of individuals, and 7.8% had someone living alone who was 65 years of age or older. The average household size was 3.43 and the average family size was 3.90.

The median age in the city was 22.8 years. 41.3% of residents were under the age of 18; 12.1% were between the ages of 18 and 24; 25.5% were from 25 to 44; 16.1% were from 45 to 64; and 4.9% were 65 years of age or older. The gender makeup of the city was 47.3% male and 52.7% female.

2000 census
As of the census of 2000, there were 619 people, 227 households, and 140 families living in the city. The population density was 675.4 people per square mile (259.8/km2). There were 262 housing units at an average density of 285.9 per square mile (110.0/km2). The racial makeup of the city was 18.26% White, 80.29% Native American, and 1.45% from two or more races. Hispanic or Latino of any race were 1.29% of the population.

There were 227 households, out of which 43.2% had children under the age of 18 living with them, 29.1% were married couples living together, 26.9% had a female householder with no husband present, and 37.9% were non-families. 33.5% of all households were made up of individuals, and 12.3% had someone living alone who was 65 years of age or older. The average household size was 2.72 and the average family size was 3.49.

In the city, the population was spread out, with 38.8% under the age of 18, 12.8% from 18 to 24, 25.8% from 25 to 44, 14.1% from 45 to 64, and 8.6% who were 65 years of age or older. The median age was 24 years. For every 100 females, there were 93.4 males. For every 100 females age 18 and over, there were 77.1 males.

As of 2000 the median income for a household in the city was $18,611, and the median income for a family was $20,313. Males had a median income of $23,125 versus $24,167 for females. The per capita income for the city was $9,192. About 41.6% of families and 47.9% of the population were below the poverty line, including 58.9% of those under age 18 and 21.6% of those age 65 or over.

Education
It is in the Eagle Butte School District, which jointly operates Cheyenne-Eagle Butte School with the Bureau of Indian Education (BIE).

Until 2014 there was also a branch of Presentation College located in the town.

Notable people
 Norm Van Brocklin - Pro Football Hall of Fame player and coach.
 Joshua Prager - Author and Journalist 
 Earl Rose - Dallas County medical examiner at the time of the Kennedy Assassination.

See also
 List of cities in South Dakota

References

External links

 

Cities in South Dakota
Cities in Dewey County, South Dakota
Cities in Ziebach County, South Dakota
1911 establishments in South Dakota
Populated places established in 1911